Amidabad (also Romanized as ‘Amīdābād; also known as Amīrābād) is a village in Sain Qaleh Rural District of the Central District of Abhar County, Zanjan province, Iran. At the 2006 National Census, its population was 2,482 in 641 households. The following census in 2011 counted 2,483 people in 781 households. The latest census in 2016 showed a population of 2,147 people in 724 households; it was the largest village in its rural district.

References 

Abhar County

Populated places in Zanjan Province

Populated places in Abhar County